Katherine Amanda Blair (born December 29, 1987) is an American actress, model and beauty queen who won Miss Teen USA 2006, becoming the first person from the state of Montana to win a major pageant title. In 2011, she was crowned Miss California USA after originally placing 1st runner-up to Alyssa Campanella. When Campanella won Miss USA 2011, Blair was crowned as successor on June 25.

Pageant participation

Miss Montana Teen USA
Blair represented Montana in the Miss Teen USA 2006 pageant held in Palm Springs, California on August 15, 2006, and became the first Montanan to place in the pageant. Outgoing titleholder, Allie LaForce of Ohio, crowned Blair as the new Miss Teen USA. Melissa Lingafelt of North Carolina placed first runner-up. Prior to Blair's win in the nationally televised pageant, Montana had been the only state in the competition's 23-year history never to have had a semi-finalist.

Houston designer Gaspar Cruz styled Blair's evening gown, hair and makeup. Previously Cruz designed gowns for Gina Giacinto, Miss Nevada USA 2001, who was top five at Miss USA, and for Shauna Gambill, Miss California USA 1998, who was first runner-up at Miss USA.

Blair's Miss Teen USA winnings included a one-year modeling contract with Trump Model Management and a scholarship to The School for Film and Television in New York City, as well as a guest appearance in the NBC soap opera Passions.

On August 24, 2007, Blair passed down the Miss Teen USA title to Hilary Cruz of Colorado.

Reign as Miss Teen USA 2006

Blair spent her year as a titleholder in New York City, living in a Trump Place apartment with Miss Universe and Miss USA 2006, Tara Conner. During her reign, Blair made appearances to raise money for charity. She lived in Sugar Land, Texas for most of her life, and actually attended school from 9-11 grade at Stephen F. Austin High School. She graduated from Billings West High School in 2006, and had planned to attend Louisiana State University, but postponed her commencement of college for her reign.

Following her win, Blair gave interviews with various media organizations, including WPIX New York and Dayside on Fox News. In September 2006, she returned to Billings, Montana for her official homecoming as Miss Teen USA. The city council announced the day as "Katie Blair Day" and awarded her a key to the city. She crowned Chelsea Nelson, also of Billings, as the next Miss Montana Teen USA 2007.

Controversy
On December 19, 2006, Donald Trump announced that Tara Conner would retain her title (Miss USA 2006) while entering a substance abuse treatment center. During the course of Connor's reign, it was alleged that she commonly partied and consumed alcohol and cocaine. Blair, a minor, allegedly drank while underage during her reign. On December 20, 2006, Mothers Against Drunk Driving announced that because of Blair's alleged activities, they would no longer use her as a spokesperson against underage drinking.

Television
Blair starred in Donald Trump's MTV reality show Pageant Place along with Rachel Smith and Riyo Mori, but was later replaced by Hilary Cruz. The show started airing on October 10, 2007. Tara Conner also made several appearances on the program. Katie and Tara Conner rekindled their friendship on the show.

Miss California USA 2011
Blair was 1st runner-up at Miss California USA 2011. The winner was Alyssa Campanella who also was Miss New Jersey Teen USA 2007. On June 25, 2011, about a week after Campanella won Miss USA 2011, Miss California USA director Keith Lewis announced Blair as the new Miss California USA 2011 effectively giving her the title.

Filmography

Film

Television

References

External links
 Miss Teen USA website
 Miss California USA website

1987 births
Living people
People from Billings, Montana
Miss Teen USA winners
2006 beauty pageant contestants
21st-century Miss Teen USA delegates
Beauty pageant controversies
Female models from Montana
Participants in American reality television series